TIVA may refer to:

People 
Tiva Ben-Yehuda or Netiva Ben-Yehuda (1928–2011), Israeli author, editor and media personality
Tiva, the portmanteau for characters Tony DiNozzo and Ziva David

Science and technology 
TIVA, medical acronym for total intravenous anesthesia; see Remifentanil
Tiva species, see Thubana
Transcriptome in vivo analysis tag (TIVA tag), a molecular biology mRNA isolation technique

Other uses
 Tiva TV, branding name for WRUA in Fajardo, Puerto Rico

See also
Tivaru
Tivat